Fawaz (sometimes, Fawwaz or Fawez) is a masculine Arabic given name and a surname. Its literal meaning is "winner", as it is the masculine adjective from the verb  fāz, meaning "he won". Therefore, it can be thought of as the equivalent to the given name Victor.

Given name

First name
Fawaz Akhras, London-based Syrian cardiologist and father-in-law of Bashar Al Assad
Fawaz Damra, imam who lived near Cleveland, Ohio
Fawaz Gerges (born 1958), Lebanese American academic and author
Fawwaz Haddad, Syrian novelist
Fawaz Al-Hasawi (born 1968), Kuwaiti businessman and owner of Nottingham Forest Football Club
Fawaz Hussain (born 1953), contemporary Kurdish writer and translator
Fawaz Naman Hamoud Abdullah Mahdi, citizen of Yemen held in extrajudicial detention in the US Guantanamo Bay detainment camps in Cuba
Fawaz Mando (born 1971), Syrian footballer
Fawaz al-Nashimi (died 2004), member of Al-Qaeda, the 20th hijacker of the September 11th attacks
Fawaz al-Rabeiee (1979–2006), al-Qaeda terrorist sentenced to death in 2004 by a Yemeni court
Fawaz al-Rabihi, citizen of Yemen believed to have played a role in the terrorist attack on the MV Limburg
Fawwaz bin Abdulaziz Al Saud, Saudi royal
Fawwaz T. Ulaby, Syrian professor of electrical engineering and computer science
Fawaz Younis (born 1959), Lebanese skyjacker who was arrested and imprisoned by the United States
Fawaz Zureikat (born 1955), Jordanian businessman

Middle name
 Sherif Fawaz Sharaf (born 1938), Jordanian diplomat

Surname
Bilal Fawaz, also known as Kelvin Fawaz, UK-based Nigerian born boxer of Lebanese/Benin descent
Fadi Fawaz George Michael's partner
Florence Fawaz childhood name of Australian soprano
Khalid al-Fawwaz convicted member of al-Qaeda
Leila Tarazi Fawaz, Lebanese historian, director of The Fares Center for Eastern Mediterranean Studies (2001–2012)
Mimi Fawaz, Nigerian-Lebanese journalist
Ramzi Fawaz, American academic of Egyptian descent

Arabic masculine given names
Surnames from given names